Niccolò II d'Este (1338 – 26 March 1388) was lord of Ferrara, Modena and Parma from 1361 until his death.

He was the son of Obizzo III, who had ruled in Ferrara from 1317 to 1352. After inheriting his lands from Aldobrandino III, he allied with Padua, Verona and Mantua against Bernabò Visconti and, after a meeting at Viterbo, he managed to obtain also the support of Pope Urban V (1367).

During Niccolò's reign, Ferrara started to gain a reputation as an art city. He commissioned to Bartolino da Novara the construction of the Castello Estense after a popular revolt in 1385.

References

 Antonio Menniti Ippolito, Este, Niccolò II d’, in Dizionario Biografico degli Italiani, XLIII, Roma 1993, pp. 393–396

1338 births
1388 deaths
Niccolo 2
Niccolo 2
14th-century Italian nobility